Major Sir Edward Alexander Henry Legge-Bourke,  (16 May 1914 – 21 May 1973), was a British politician, and a Member of Parliament for Isle of Ely from 1945 until his death in 1973.

Early life
Legge-Bourke was born as the only child of Lt. Nigel Walter Legge-Bourke (1889–1914), who was killed in action in World War I in October 1914, and Lady Victoria Alexandrina Wynn-Carington (1892–1966). Through his paternal grandfather, soldier and courtier Henry Legge, he was a great-grandson of the 5th Earl of Dartmouth. His maternal grandfather was the Marquess of Lincolnshire, and his maternal grandmother, the Hon. Cecilia Margaret née Harbord, was the daughter of the 5th Baron Suffield.

He served alongside Jock Colville (his half–second cousin) as a Page of Honour from 1926. Educated at Eton College and the Royal Military College, Sandhurst, Legge-Bourke was commissioned into the Royal Horse Guards in 1934. He served there throughout the World War II, rising to the rank of major. In 1941, he was liaison officer, GHQ, British Forces in Greece, and served with the 7th Armoured Division at El Alamein.

Politics
Legge-Bourke was elected Member of Parliament for the Isle of Ely in 1945 as a member of the Conservative Party. His gain from the Liberal James de Rothschild was one of the few Conservative gains of the election. In 1954 he resigned his membership of the official Conservative party and sat as an independent conservative member for a period.  In 1960 he was invested as a KBE. As an East Anglian representative, he was particularly interested in land drainage and was vice-President of the Association of Drainage Authorities. A popular local MP (he was made a Freeman by Wisbech Municipal Borough in 1973), he did instruct Prime Minister Clement Attlee to "Change the bloody record" as he threw a coin at him – an incident which had him briefly debarred from the Commons. Legge-Bourke chaired the 1922 Committee of Conservative backbenchers from 1970 to 1972, when he resigned due to poor health.

Family
Legge-Bourke married Catherine Jean Grant (1917–2007), daughter of Colonel Sir Arthur Grant of Monymusk, 10th Bt, and Evelyn Alice Lindsay Wood. They had three children:
 William Nigel Henry Legge-Bourke (1939–2009); married the Hon. Elizabeth Shân Josephine Bailey, daughter of the 3rd Baron Glanusk, and had issue.
 Heneage Legge-Bourke (born 1948); married Maria Clara de Sá-Carneiro, and had issue (including Eleanor Legge-Bourke).
 Victoria Lindsay Legge-Bourke (born 1950).

He inherited a fraction of the Lord Great Chamberlainship of England, succeeded by his son, William. His daughter-in-law, the Hon. Shân Legge-Bourke, Lord Lieutenant of Powys, was made a lady-in-waiting to Elizabeth II. His granddaughter, Alexandra "Tiggy" Legge-Bourke (now Pettifer), was nanny to Princes William and Harry. Another granddaughter, Eleanor Legge-Bourke, is a television personality in France.

Legge-Bourke died at his home in London on 21 May 1973, aged 59, after an operation for a stomach tumour. The by-election to replace him was won by Liberal Clement Freud. Legge-Bourke and his wife were cremated and their ashes buried in Ely Cathedral.

Notes and references

Notes

References

External links 
 

1914 births
1973 deaths
British Army personnel of World War II
Burials at Ely Cathedral
Chairmen of the 1922 Committee
Conservative Party (UK) MPs for English constituencies
Deaths from cancer in England
Deaths from stomach cancer
Graduates of the Royal Military College, Sandhurst
Knights Commander of the Order of the British Empire
People educated at Eton College
Royal Horse Guards officers
UK MPs 1945–1950
UK MPs 1950–1951
UK MPs 1951–1955
UK MPs 1955–1959
UK MPs 1959–1964
UK MPs 1964–1966
UK MPs 1966–1970
UK MPs 1970–1974